Camber was an American emo/post-hardcore band from New York City, recognized for being one of the pioneer of the second-wave Eastern indie emo sound. They were often compared to likes of Texas Is the Reason, Sunny Day Real Estate and Mineral. Roger Coletti replaced original drummer Chris Chin in 2001, before their final release.

Discography
Albums
 Beautiful Charade (1997)
 Anyway, I've Been There (1999)
 Wake Up and Be Happy (2002)

Single and splits
 "Hollowed-Out" b/w Question Marks (1996)
 Split with Kid Brother Collective (1999)
 Brandtson–Camber–Seven Storey (2003)

External links
 Camber on Deep Elm Records
 [ Camber on Allmusic]
 Camber on RateYourMusic

American emo musical groups
American post-hardcore musical groups
Indie rock musical groups from New York (state)
Musical groups from New York City